Birk Irving (born July 26, 1999) is an American freestyle skier.

Biography 
He participated at the halfpipe event at the FIS Freestyle Ski and Snowboarding World Championships 2021, winning a medal. 

He competed in the 2022 Winter Olympics in the men's halfpipe where he finished 5th overall.

References

External links

Living people
1999 births
American male freestyle skiers
People from Englewood, Colorado
Freestyle skiers at the 2016 Winter Youth Olympics
Freestyle skiers at the 2022 Winter Olympics
Olympic freestyle skiers of the United States
Youth Olympic gold medalists for the United States
X Games athletes